Claudia María Hernández Oré (born 1981) is a Peruvian TV Host, model and beauty queen. She was born in Lima. She studied Business Administration at the Peruvian University of Applied Sciences and studied Marketing at Universidad San Ignacio de Loyola. She won the Miss Peru Mundo 2003 contest and  participated in Reinado Internacional de las Flores 2003 beauty contest where she because the first queen. She was one of the 20 semi-finalists in the Miss World 2003 contest, where she won best gown (Best Dress Designer Award).

In entertainment, she co-hosted a Peruvian television show based on a singing talent contest format, called Camino a la fama on the ATV Channel. She also co-hosted the 2006 Miss Peru Mundo contest.
During 2006 and 2009 she worked as a  Press TV Host in Panamericana Television in a program called Reportajes. Also in the same year she co-host the press space 24 Horas Sabatino with great success. Now Claudia has become one of the TV hosts with more potential to succeed in Perú. Now many fans are waiting to see her in a new channel or in a new space in the Peruvian television.

Hernández is also a businesswoman, and owns a Peruvian NGO called Identidad y Valores Perú for the promotion of the Peruvian image abroad. And also she is the owner of Castor Media, an agency of marketing and communications.

Personal data 
Hair: Black
Eyes: Dark Brown
Height: 1.73m

References

Living people
1981 births
Peruvian female models
Miss World 2003 delegates
Peruvian beauty pageant winners
Peruvian women in business